Kentish Town is a London Underground and National Rail station in Kentish Town in the London Borough of Camden. It is at the junction of Kentish Town Road (A400) and Leighton Road. It is in Travelcard Zone 2. The station is served by the High Barnet branch of the London Underground Northern line, and by Thameslink trains on the National Rail Midland Main Line.

History

Until the St. Pancras extension was complete, and for some time afterwards, some trains exchanged the locomotive at Kentish Town for one fitted with condensing apparatus and continued to Moorgate station, then named Moorgate Street station. For some years trains ran from Kentish Town to Victoria station on the South Eastern and Chatham Railway.

The second largest motive power depot and repair facility on the Midland Rail was north of the station. In 1861 a collision occurred at a siding near the station in which 16 people were killed and 317 were injured.

The main line station was rebuilt in 1983, nothing of the original station building remains. The separate London Underground station was opened on 22 June 1907 by the Charing Cross, Euston & Hampstead Railway (CCE&HR), a precursor of the Northern line. The station was designed by Leslie Green with the ox-blood red glazed terracotta façade and the semi-circular windows at first floor level common to most of the original stations on the CCE&HR and its two associated railways, the Baker Street and Waterloo Railway and Great Northern, Piccadilly and Brompton Railway which opened the previous year. When Kentish Town station opened the next CCE&HR station south was South Kentish Town but that station closed in 1924 due to low usage.  station on the North London line opened in 1860 as "Kentish Town" but was given its present name in 1867 when the North London Railway opened .
It was the junction of services to Barking until 1981 when services were diverted to terminate and start from Gospel Oak. The spur line to Junction Road Junction was then closed, the track was removed and the trackbed has been sold for industrial use.

Design

National Rail station 
There are 6 tracks and 4 platforms at this station in northwest–southeast orientation.

Starting from the easternmost platform:
 Platforms 1 and 2 are Thameslink platforms in regular use, where all Thameslink trains accessing the core pass through, although only a minority of them stop here.
 Platforms 3 (which forms an island with platform 2) and 4 are on the slow lines of Midland main line, which are normally unused apart from a handful of Sunday morning services terminating at St Pancras high level using platform 3.
 The fast lines of Midland main line do not have platforms at this station in both directions.

The National Rail station entrance is normally locked, with access from the Underground station. It is only opened when the Underground station is closed.

London Underground station 
There are 2 platforms in the underground station in north–south orientation, 1 for each Northern line direction. Ticket barriers control access to both London Underground and National Rail platforms.

Location

Services
Thameslink operate the National Rail station at Kentish Town, and all stopping services. The normal off-peak calling pattern is four trains per hour between St Albans City and Sutton, of which two go via Mitcham Junction and two via Wimbledon. Some peak-hour, late-night, or Sunday trains may be extended to locations such as Luton, Bedford, or Rainham.

Many other trains pass through the station without stopping, including East Midlands Railway services from Nottingham, Sheffield, Leicester, and Corby, as well as other Thameslink services.

After the bay platforms at Blackfriars station closed in March 2009, Southeastern services which previously terminated at Blackfriars were extended to Kentish Town (off-peak), or St Albans, Luton, or Bedford (peak hours).

A major upgrading of the whole Thameslink line infrastructure is underway, for expected completion by 2018. However, the four platforms at Kentish Town station are not being extended from eight to 12 carriages because of road bridges at each end which cannot be relocated, so only services that continue to be served by eight-car trains will be able to call there.

 Note: this template is wrong. For the 1907 former service, please read Hampstead instead of Northern, with a violet color instead of black

Connections

London Buses routes 88, 134, 214, 393 and night route N20 serve the station.

Incidents
On 21 August 2020 a man was badly injured by a high-up sign that fell off Kentish Town station. The sign, with the logos of TfL and British Rail (visible in the image at the top of this page), had been reported as looking as if it was about to fall, but no action was taken at the time.

References

External links

 Station building in 1925.

Northern line stations
Railway stations in the London Borough of Camden
DfT Category F1 stations
Tube stations in the London Borough of Camden
Former Charing Cross, Euston and Hampstead Railway stations
Former Midland Railway stations
Railway stations in Great Britain opened in 1868
Railway stations served by Govia Thameslink Railway
Station
Leslie Green railway stations
London Underground Night Tube stations